The 12405 / 12406 Bhusaval–Hazrat Nizamuddin Gondwana Express is a Superfast Express train belonging to Indian Railways – Northern Railway zone that runs between  and  in India.

It operates as train number 12405 from Bhusaval Junction to Hazrat Nizamuddin and as train number 12406 in the reverse direction, serving the states of Maharashtra, Madhya Pradesh, Uttar Pradesh & Delhi.

Coaches

The 12405 / 06 Bhusaval–Hazrat Nizamuddin Gondwana Express has 1 AC 2 tier, 2 AC 3 tier, 13 Sleeper class, 3 General Unreserved & 2 SLR (Seating cum Luggage Rake) coaches. It does not carry a pantry car.

As is customary with most train services in India, coach composition may be amended at the discretion of Indian Railways depending on demand.

Service

The 12405 Bhusaval–Hazrat Nizamuddin Gondwana Express covers the distance of 1476 kilometres in 25 hours 45 mins (57.32 km/hr) & in 24 hours 25 mins as 12406 Hazrat Nizamuddin–Bhusaval Gondwana Express (60.45 km/hr).

As the average speed of the train is above , as per Indian Railways rules, its fare includes a Superfast surcharge.

Routeing

Traction

As the entire route is fully electrified, it is hauled by a Bhusaval-based WAP-4 or Tughlakabad-based WAP-7 locomotive on its entire journey.

Timings

 12405 Bhusaval–Hazrat Nizamuddin Gondwana Express leaves Bhusaval Junction every Tuesday & Sunday at 05:40 hrs IST and reaches Hazrat Nizamuddin at 07:25 hrs IST the next day.
 12406 Hazrat Nizamuddin–Bhusaval Gondwana Express leaves Hazrat Nizamuddin every Friday & Sunday at 15:25 hrs IST and reaches Bhusaval Junction at 15:50 hrs IST the next day.

Rake sharing
The train shares its rake with 12409/12410 Raigarh–Hazrat Nizamuddin Gondwana Express.

References 

 https://www.youtube.com/watch?v=Vo4xQeeDF4E
 http://www.irfca.org/gallery/GeneralScenes/GONDWANA+EXPRESS.jpg.html
 
 https://www.flickr.com/photos/8893421@N06/7561325836/

External links

Transport in Delhi
Transport in Bhusawal
Express trains in India
Rail transport in Maharashtra
Rail transport in Madhya Pradesh
Rail transport in Uttar Pradesh
Rail transport in Delhi
Named passenger trains of India